Sam Webb (born 23 May 1986) is a British model.

Career
Sam Webb was born in Birmingham, after being scouted in 2006 in his hometown by top modelling agency Select model management.  He began a lucrative modelling career for various brands including, Frankie Morello, Iceberg, Calvin Klein, Belstaff, Armani and many other top brands.

His first big break came walking in a plethora of Milan fashion shows. He was selected for the promotional campaign for Dolce & Gabbana photographed by Steven Klein alongside fellow models Adam Senn, David Gandy, and Noah Mills. Sam has continued to work at the highest level of the modelling industry shooting for Vogue Italia, Vogue Hommes, GQ, GQ style and on numerous occasions working alongside top photographers such as Bruce Weber, Giampaolo Sgura and Morelli brothers.

He has starred in various TV commercials such as: Diesel Only the Brave Tattoo Fragrance, Schweppes and Garnier to name a few.

Sam Webb became one of the faces of Dolce & Gabbana, appearing in the promotional campaigns of the brand. Thanks to such popularity, Sam Webb began working for other brands such as Roberto Cavalli, Giorgio Armani, Diesel, Ermanno Scervino, and 7 For All Mankind  in an advertising campaign alongside Angela Lindvall.

He stars on Models.com with the accolade of a “money” guy in the Modelling industry.  He continues to be at the forefront of the male modelling world.

In 2021 he stars in Dolce & Gabbana alongside Sharon Stone and Adam Senn

Agencies
New Madison - Paris
Priscilla's Model Management - Sydney
Select Model Management - London
Soul Artist Management - New York City
Elite Toronto - Toronto
View Management - Barcelona
Why Not Model Management - Milan

References

External links
 Sam Webb on models.com

1989 births
British male models
Living people
People from Birmingham, West Midlands